International Institute of Cambodia (IIC) was created in 1999. In 2007, IIC merged with the Asean University to become the Phnom Penh International University (PPIU). But in 2008, PPIU separated into two parts. One of them is still called the PPIU and the other became the IIC University of Technology.

Structure of Lepro Tech
CEO Creative Director: Sreejith S Nair.
CFO Business Developer: Thoufeeq Aslam.
CTO Infrastructure Developer: Arjun Babu C.

Structure of IIC University of Technology
Rector Name: Dr. CHHUON Chanthon
Vice Rector Name: Po Bonna.

Universities and colleges in Cambodia
Education in Phnom Penh
Educational institutions established in 1999
Cambodian companies established in 1999
Educational institutions disestablished in 2007
2007 disestablishments in Cambodia